= Shandong Vocational College of Science and Technology =

Education Institute

- 山东科技职业学院 (Chinese)
- Type: Public
- Established: 1978
- Students: ~16,000
- Location: Weifang, Shandong, China
- Website: SVCST English Website; SVCST Chinese Website

Chinese name
- Simplified Chinese: 山东科技职业学院
- Traditional Chinese: 山東科技職業學院
Transcriptions
Standard Mandarin
- Hanyu Pinyin: Shāndōng Kējì Zhíyè Xuéyuàn

Shandong Vocational College of Science and Technology (SVCST; Chinese: 山东科技职业学院) is a post-secondary institution in Weifang, Shandong.

As of 2017 it had 16,000 full-time students. Its two campuses are Fuyan Mountain Campus and Binhai Campus. It was established in 1978.
